Austral means 'southern', often in reference to the Southern Hemisphere.

Austral may also refer to:

Businesses
Austral Líneas Aéreas, an Argentine airline
Air Austral, an airline based in Réunion
Austral (bus manufacturer), a defunct Australian bus body manufacturer

Education
Austral University, a private university in Argentina
Universidad Austral de Chile, a Chilean traditional university

Entertainment venues
Austral Picture Palace, Kilkenny, South Australia
Austral Picture Theatre, Collingwood, Victoria, Australia
Austral Theatre, Naracoorte, South Australia
The Austral, a pub in Rundle Street, Adelaide, South Australia

Events
Austral Wheel Race, the world's oldest track bicycle race, held in Victoria, Australia
Australasian Intervarsity Debating Championships, a collegiate debating tournament also known as the "Australs"

Places
Austral, New South Wales, a suburb of Sydney, Australia
Austral Islands, the southernmost group of islands in French Polynesia
Zona Austral, the southernmost region of Chile

Transport
Motor vehicles
Austral (automobile), a French car manufactured in 1907
 Renault Austral, a compact crossover SUV motor vehicle
Ships
Austral (1881), a passenger ship that sank in 1882 near Sydney, Australia
L'Austral, a cruise ship built in 2010

Other uses
Austral language, the language of the Austral Islands
Argentine austral, a former currency of Argentina
Austral plan, an economic plan in Argentina

See also
Austal, an Australian shipbuilder
Australia, a large country in the southern hemisphere